HMS Mercia was a shore establishment of the Royal Navy based in Smith Street, Coventry, in the United Kingdom. It functioned as a communications training centre.

When HMS Mercia was decommissioned, her ship's bell was presented to Coventry Cathedral

References

Royal Navy shore establishments
Coventry